Presidential and vice-presidential elections were held in South Korea on 15 May 1956. The result was a victory for Syngman Rhee, who won 70.0% of the vote. Voter turnout was 94.4%.

Rhee, who at that time held a virtual monopoly on political power, was opposed by Shin Ik-hee and Cho Bong-am. Shin died before the election by disease, and Cho campaigned on a platform of peaceful reunification in opposition to Rhee's policy of "March North and unify Korea". Cho exceeded expectations by receiving over 30% of the vote. Three years later, Cho was accused of violating the National Security Law and executed.

Results

President

By region

Vice-President

By region

References

1956 elections in South Korea
Presidential elections in South Korea